Richard Hawkins (born 1961 in Mexia, Texas) is an American artist.   He lives and works in Los Angeles. His works are held by museums including the Whitney Museum of American Art, the Museum of Modern Art, and the Art Institute of Chicago.

He received a Bachelor of Fine Arts from the University of Texas, Austin in 1984 and a Master of Fine Arts from the California Institute of the Arts (Cal Arts) in 1988. After graduating from Cal Arts, Hawkins worked for a time as a short story writer.  Hawkins' art largely consists of sculpture and collage.  His works combine "ubiquitous pop-culture images and objects with arcane references and quotes"; frequent themes include "current celebrities, literary lions of yesteryear, haunted houses, Asian sex tourism, Greek and Roman statuary and the American Indian experience". He is gay, and his sexuality also informs his artwork. According to art historian Richard Meyer, Hawkins' "mash-up [of] avant-garde, kitsch and kink", including the use of traditionally feminine consumer items, "challenge[s] us to rethink our hierarchies of value and visual pleasure."

Hawkins was instrumental in reviving the work of the late artist Tony Greene, including co-curating (with Catherine Opie) an exhibition of Greene's work that was included in the 2014 Whitney Biennial exhibition in New York.

Selected solo exhibitions

"Collage Paintings, Gesture Paintings" and "To the House of Shibusawa", Galerie Buchholz, Cologne (2018)
"Being and its Fetuses: New Ceramics, Galerie Buchholz, Cologne (2016)
"Hijikata Twist", Tate Liverpool (2014) 
"Smoke-Smoke Salome", Galerie Buchholz, Cologne (2011)
"Third Mind", Hammer Museum, Los Angeles (2011)
"focus: Richard Hawkins: Third Mind", Art Institute of Chicago (2010)

References

Further reading

1961 births
Living people
American LGBT artists
People from Mexia, Texas
Artists from Los Angeles
University of Texas at Austin alumni
California Institute of the Arts alumni
Artists from Texas
LGBT people from Texas
LGBT people from California
20th-century American male artists
21st-century American male artists